Jonathan Thirkield is an American poet, currently living in New York City.

Life
Thirkield was born and raised in New York City. He graduated from Wesleyan University, and was a Truman Capote Fellow at the University of Iowa's Writers' Workshop. Thirkield was born and raised in New York City.

He achieved critical acclaim for his debut poetry collection, The Waker's Corridor, which won the 2008 Walt Whitman Award, as selected by Linda Bierds and presented by the Academy of American Poets.

His poems have been featured in several journals, including WebConjunctions, The Colorado Review, and American Letters & Commentary, among others.

Works
 The Waker's Corridor, LSU Press. ,

References

American male poets
Year of birth missing (living people)
Writers from New York City
Wesleyan University alumni
Iowa Writers' Workshop alumni
Living people